Davide Mazzanti (born 15 October 1976 in Fano, Italy) is an Italian volleyball coach of the Italian national team, which he coached at the 2017 Women's European Volleyball Championship as well as the 2019 edition.

References

1976 births
Living people
Italian volleyball coaches
People from Fano
Sportspeople from the Province of Pesaro and Urbino